Events from the year 1964 in Kuwait.

Incumbents
Emir: Abdullah Al-Salim Al-Sabah 
Prime Minister: Sabah Al-Salim Al-Sabah

Events

Births

 13 September - Khaled Al-Awadhi.

See also
Years in Jordan
Years in Syria

References

 
Kuwait
Kuwait
Years of the 20th century in Kuwait
1960s in Kuwait